Limbodessus is a genus of beetles in the family Dytiscidae, first described by Félix Guignot in 1939.  It contains the following species:

 Limbodessus amabilis (Clark, 1862)
 Limbodessus atypicalis Watts & Humphreys, 2006
 Limbodessus barwidgeeensis Watts & Humphreys, 2006
 Limbodessus bennetti Watts & McRae, 2013
 Limbodessus bialveus (Watts & Humphreys, 2003)
 Limbodessus bigbellensis (Watts & Humphreys, 2000)
 Limbodessus capeensis Watts & Leys, 2005
 Limbodessus challaensis (Watts & Humphreys, 2001)
 Limbodessus cheesmanae (J.Balfour-Browne, 1939)
 Limbodessus compactus (Clark, 1862)
 Limbodessus cooperi Watts & Humphreys, 2006
 Limbodessus cueensis (Watts & Humphreys, 2000)
 Limbodessus cunyuensis (Watts & Humphreys, 2003)
 Limbodessus curviplicatus (Zimmermann, 1927)
 Limbodessus eberhardi (Watts & Humphreys, 1999)
 Limbodessus exilis Watts & Humphreys, 2006
 Limbodessus fridaywellensis (Watts & Humphreys, 2001)
 Limbodessus gemellus (Clark, 1862)
 Limbodessus gumwellensis Watts & Humphreys, 2006
 Limbodessus hahni (Watts & Humphreys, 2000)
 Limbodessus harleyi Watts & Humphreys, 2006
 Limbodessus hillviewensis (Watts & Humphreys, 2004)
 Limbodessus hinkleri (Watts & Humphreys, 2000)
 Limbodessus inornatus (Sharp, 1882)
 Limbodessus jundeeensis (Watts & Humphreys, 2003)
 Limbodessus karalundiensis (Watts & Humphreys, 2003)
 Limbodessus lapostaae (Watts & Humphreys, 1999)
 Limbodessus leysi Watts & Humphreys, 2006
 Limbodessus macrohinkleri Watts & Humphreys, 2006
 Limbodessus macrotarsus (Watts & Humphreys, 2003)
 Limbodessus magnificus (Watts & Humphreys, 2000)
 Limbodessus masonensis (Watts & Humphreys, 2001)
 Limbodessus melitaensis Watts & Humphreys, 2006
 Limbodessus micrommatoion Watts & Humphreys, 2006
 Limbodessus microocula (Watts & Humphreys, 2004)
 Limbodessus millbilliensis Watts & Humphreys, 2006
 Limbodessus mirandaae Watts & Humphreys, 2006
 Limbodessus morgani (Watts & Humphreys, 2000)
 Limbodessus nambiensis Watts & Humphreys, 2006
 Limbodessus narryerensis Watts & Humphreys, 2006
 Limbodessus occidentalis (Watts & Humphreys, 2004)
 Limbodessus padburyensis (Watts & Humphreys, 2004)
 Limbodessus palmulaoides Watts & Humphreys, 2006
 Limbodessus phoebeae Watts & Humphreys, 2006
 Limbodessus pinnaclesensis (Watts & Humphreys, 2001)
 Limbodessus praelargus (Lea, 1899)
 Limbodessus pulpa (Watts & Humphreys, 1999)
 Limbodessus raeae Watts & Humphreys, 2006
 Limbodessus raesideensis (Watts & Humphreys, 2001)
 Limbodessus rivulus (Larson, 1994)
 Limbodessus shuckardii (Clark, 1862)
 Limbodessus silus (Watts & Humphreys, 2003)
 Limbodessus surreptitius Watts & Humphreys, 2006
 Limbodessus sweetwatersensis (Watts & Humphreys, 2003)
 Limbodessus usitatus Watts & Humphreys, 2006
 Limbodessus wilunaensis (Watts & Humphreys, 2003)
 Limbodessus windarraensis (Watts & Humphreys, 1999)
 Limbodessus wogarthaensis (Watts & Humphreys, 2004)
 Limbodessus yandalensis Watts & Humphreys, 2006
 Limbodessus yuinmeryensis (Watts & Humphreys, 2003)

References

Dytiscidae genera
Taxa named by Félix Guignot
Animals described in 1939